Federal Building, also known as the Wilkes County Board of Education Building, is a historic government building located at Wilkesboro, Wilkes County, North Carolina. It was designed by the Office of the Supervising Architect under James A. Wetmore and built in 1915.  It is a five-part brick building in the Federal Revival style. It consists of a two-story, three-bay central section, flanked by one-story entrances, which are in turn flanked by one-story wings. The post office was located in the west wing. The building features terra cotta decorative elements.

It was listed on the National Register of Historic Places in 1982.

References

Federal buildings in the United States
Government buildings on the National Register of Historic Places in North Carolina
Colonial Revival architecture in North Carolina
Government buildings completed in 1915
Buildings and structures in Wilkes County, North Carolina
National Register of Historic Places in Wilkes County, North Carolina